The Ministry of Territorial Administration and Infrastructure of Armenia is a republican body of executive authority, which elaborates and implements the government's policy in the field of local governance and infrastructures.

The current minister is Gnel Sanosyan. This Ministry also oversees the National Archives of Armenia and the Civil Aviation Committee.

References

External links 

Terrotorial Administration and Infrastructure
Ministries established in 1995
1995 establishments in Armenia
Armenia